Luigi's Rollickin' Roadsters is a trackless dancing cars ride located in Cars Land at Disney California Adventure. The attraction, which opened on March 7, 2016, features Luigi, the Italian roadster who runs the Casa Della Tires shop in Radiator Springs.

The attraction is the first at the Disneyland Resort to use a trackless ride system.
Other ride systems in Disney Parks that use trackless technology include The Twilight Zone Tower of Terror in Walt Disney World, Pooh's Hunny Hunt and Aquatopia in Tokyo Disney Resort, Mystic Manor in Hong Kong Disneyland, and Ratatouille in Disneyland Paris.

The attraction replaced Luigi's Flying Tires, which was inspired by Disneyland's Flying Saucers attraction from the 1960s.

Description 
Luigi has invited his cousins from Carsoli, Italy, to Radiator Springs for a dance festival in the tire yard behind his Casa Della Tires shop. Guests ride in the car vehicles as they move and spin to Italian music.

During Halloween Time at the Disneyland Resort, the attraction transforms into Luigi's Honkin' Haul-O-Ween and during Christmas time, it becomes Luigi's Joy to the Whirl.

References

External links

Amusement rides introduced in 2016
Pixar in amusement parks
Walt Disney Parks and Resorts attractions
Disney California Adventure
Cars Land
2016 establishments in California